The Estates General of French Canada were a series of three assizes held in Montreal, Quebec, Canada between 1966 and 1969. Organized by the Ligue d'action nationale and coordinated by the Fédération des Sociétés Saint-Jean-Baptistes du Québec (FSSJBQ), the stated objective of these Estates General was to consult the French-Canadian people on their constitutional future.

Origins 
According to Rosaire Morin, editor of the L'Action nationale review, the idea of the Estates General was launched by the FSSJBQ in 1961. Annual assemblies gathering the representatives of several French-Canadian associations occurred around that time, but these involved no more than 30 people.

In May 1963, MLA Jean-Jacques Bertrand presented a motion in the Legislative Assembly of Quebec in which he asked for the setting up of "a special committee to prepare the convocation of the French-Canadian General Estates". However, this move was not followed and the initiative of convening the Estates General came from civil society instead of the Quebec Parliament.

In April 1964, the proposal of the FSSJBQ regarding the Estates General was endorsed by various associations and intermediary bodies of Quebec's civil society. In November 1965, a provisional committee composed of 27 members was set up to try to reach out as many associations as possible.

The December 1965 issue of L'Action nationale contained a first article treating the subject of the history and functioning of the Estates General in France. A second article on the same subject was published in the February 1966 issue. A third one was intended for the May–June 1966 issue, but this issue was never published.

The president of the Estates General, lawyer Albert Leblanc, was appointed to the Superior Court of Quebec during the course of the year 1966 and was replaced by law professor Jacques-Yvan Morin.

Preliminary assizes of 1966 

The Preliminary assizes of 1966 were the first meeting of the Estates General of French Canada. The assizes, held from November 25 to 27 at Université de Montréal, were said to be preliminary because their objective was to prepare the working material on the basis of which the subsequent assizes were to debate.

National assizes of 1967 

The National assizes of 1967 were the second meeting of the Estates General of French Canada. They were held from November 23 to 26 at Place des Arts in Montreal. the delegates adopted among others an important resolution pertaining to the right to self-determination of the French Canadians on the territory of Quebec, which was declared the "national territory and fundamental political milieu" of their nation.

National assizes of 1969 

The National assizes of 1969 were the third and last meeting of the Estates General of French Canada. They were held from March 5 to 9 at the Queen Elizabeth Hotel. The delegates adopted among others an important resolution proposing to convene a constituent assembly for the drafting of the constitution of Quebec.

Timeline 
 1966 – On September 13, election of the territorial delegates to the preliminary assizes.
 1966 – From November 25 to 27, the preliminary assizes are held at Université de Montréal.
 1967 – On April 16, election of the territorial delegates to the first national assizes.
 1967 – From November 23 to 26, the first national assizes are held at Place des Arts in Montreal.
 1969 – From March 5 to 9, the second national assizes are held at the Queen Elizabeth Hotel in Montreal.

Notes

References 
 Marcel Martel, "Estates General of French Canada", in The Canadian Encyclopedia. Fondation Historica, 2008
 Rosaire Morin, "Les États généraux du Canada français", in L'Action nationale, 1990, 80, 6, p. 799-815.

Further reading 
 Studies
  Michel Bock (2001).  (1960-1975), Sudbury: Institut franco-ontarien / Prise de parole, 119 p. (critical review)
 Marcel Martel (1998). French Canada: An Account of its Creation and Break up, 1850-1967. Ottawa: The Canadian Historical Association, 32 p.
 Marcel Martel and Robert Choquette (1998). Les États généraux du Canada français, trente ans après : actes du colloque tenu à l’Université d’Ottawa les 5, 6 et 7 novembre 1997, Ottawa : Centre de recherche en civilisation canadienne-française de l’Université d’Ottawa, 422 p.
 Marcel Martel (1997). Deuil d'un pays imaginé. Rêves, luttes et déroute du Canada-français. Les rapports entre le Québec et la francophonie canadienne, 1867-1975, Ottawa : Presses de l'Université d'Ottawa, 204 p.

 Articles
 Marcel Martel, "Faut-il se souvenir de la tenue des États généraux du Canada français?", in L'annuaire du Québec 2007, p. 208-210
 Gratien Allaire, "Le triangle Canadien-Français au tournant des années 1960. le conseil de la vie Française en Amérique, la société Saint-Jean-Baptiste de Montréal et l'Ordre de Jacques-Cartier", in Francophonies d'Amérique, 17 (2004) p. 108-117 
 Martin Pâquet, "Un nouveau contrat social : les États généraux du Canada français et l’immigration, novembre 1967", in Bulletin d’histoire politique, 2001, 10, 2, p. 123-134.
 Jean Tournon, "Langue et politique linguistique aux États généraux du Canada français (1967)", in Études canadiennes - Canadian Studies, No. 45, 1998, pp. 185–194
 Michel Sarra-Bournet and Lucien-Pierre Bouchard, "Au-delà de la rupture politique entre les francophonies canadienne et québécoise", in Le site des cours de Michel Sarra-Bournet, Ph.D. chargé de cours en histoire et en science politique, 1997
 Michel Bock, "Les États généraux du Canada français, ou l'éclatement de la nation : une analyse des journaux de langue française de Sudbury", in Revue du Nouvel-Ontario, 1996

 Publications by the Estates General
 EGCF (1969). Assises nationales tenues à l'hôtel Reine Elisabeth du 5 au 9 mars 1969, Montréal : Action nationale, 646 p. (L'Action nationale, vol. LVIII, N 9 et 10, mai-juin 1969)
 EGCF. Les Cahiers des États généraux du Canada français, Montréal, 1967-69 (19 issues)
 EGCF (1968). Les États généraux du Canada français : assises nationales tenues à la Place des arts de Montréal du 23 au 26 novembre 1967, Montréal : Éditions de l'Action nationale, 380 p. (L'Action nationale, vol. LVII, N 6, fév. 1968)
 EGCF (1967). Les États généraux du Canada français : assises préliminaires tenues à l'Université de Montréal, du 25 au 27 novembre 1966, Montréal, 128 p.
 EGCF (1967). États généraux du Canada français : exposés de base et documents de travail, Montréal : Éditions de L'Action nationale, 277 p.
 EGCF (1967). Un peuple en marche, le 16 avril 1967, s.n., 23 p.
 EGCF (1966). Un peuple parle, s.n., 16 p.

Political history of Quebec
20th century in Canada